The discography of American rock band Saosin, consists of three studio albums, three extended plays (EPs), eight singles and ten music videos.

Albums

Studio albums

Live albums

Extended plays

Singles

"—" denotes singles that did not chart.

Promotional singles

Music videos

Compilation tracks
 A Santa Cause: It's a Punk Rock Christmas (2003) – "Mookie's Last Christmas"
 Music on the Brain Volume 1 (2004) – "I Can Tell There Was an Accident Here Earlier"
 The Mission Family Spring Sampler 05 (2005) – "Penelope" (Acoustic) (Pinback Cover)
 The Best of Taste of Chaos (2006) – "I Wanna Hear Another Fast Song" (Live) (UK Edition Only)
 Take Action! Volume 5 (2006) – "Sleepers" (Demo)
 AOL Sessions Under Cover (2007) - "Time After Time" (Acoustic) (Cyndi Lauper Cover)
 Chew It Out!: Stride Gum CD Sampler (2007) – "Sleepers" (Live Recording)
 NCIS: Soundtrack - VOL. 2 (2009) - "Move Slow"

Other use of Saosin tracks
 Atticus... Dragging the Lake Volume 3 (2005) – "Bury Your Head"
 2007 KROQ New ROQ (2006) – "Voices"
 Reef: Bobby Martinez Mixed Tape (2007) – "It's Far Better To Learn"
 ATV Offroad Fury Pro (2007) - "Sleepers"
 The Best of Taste of Chaos Two (2007) – "Follow and Feel"
 Saw IV: Original Motion Picture Soundtrack (2007) – "Collapse"
 MX vs. ATV: Untamed (2007) - "Collapse"
 Burnout Dominator (2007) - "Collapse"
 Burnout Paradise (2008) - "Collapse"

Demos
Saosin has released many instrumental and individual demos, but no official demo tapes. A more detailed list can be found here.
 Instrumental Demos (With Justin and Beau, not yet called Saosin) (2003)
 "I Can Tell There Was An Accident Here Earlier" (Demo with Anthony Green) (2003)
 Instrumental Demos (2004)
 "Mookie's Last Christmas" (Acoustic Audition) with Cove Reber on Vocals (2004)
 "I Can Tell... (There Was An Accident Here)" (Demo re-recorded with Cove Reber) (2004)
 Capitol Demos (Including "Uphill Battle") (2005)
 "Come Close" Instrumental Demo (2005)
 Demos known as "The Norma Jean Song", "Back to Greatness" and "Untitled" (2010)
 3rd Studio Album Demos sessions with Tilian Pearson on vocals (known as "Change" and "Promises") (2011)
 Instrumental demos known as "Brikka Brikka" and "Exfoliator" ["The Norma Jean Song" re-recorded demo] released in "In Search of Solid Ground (iTunes version)" (2012)
 "Exfoliator" (Re-recorded with Tilian Pearson on 3rd Studio Album Demos sessions [possibly recorded in 2011]) (2012)

References

Discographies of American artists
Rock music group discographies